Arena of Blood was a board game published by Games Workshop in issue #229 of White Dwarf Magazine. It was set in the universe of their popular Warhammer 40,000 miniatures game.

Plot
The game takes place in a Dark Eldar gladiator arena. Each player takes controls of one unit (known as a Wych), and pits it against the opponent's Wyches. Games could be linked into Campaigns over the course of which players could acquire a team of Wyches.

Game Pieces
The game came with its own playmat, cardboard cut-outs of the Wyches, and cardboard obstacles resembling large piles of jagged metal referred to as 'Murder Stakes'. Dice had to be supplied by the players. The playmat consisted of numerous hexagonal spaces, some already occupied by Murder Stakes, statistics for each Wych were located at either end of the mat.

Overview
The game would start with each player taking turns placing Murder Stakes around the playmat. Players would then randomly select a Wych and place it at the edge of the board. Each Wych had a certain number of action points which could be spent to move the Wych across the playmat, or engage in combat with other players' Wyches. Combat was resolved by means of dice rolling, and then comparing the results to the attacks listed for their particular Wych. Players could choose from 6 different Wyches, each with unique statistics and attacks.

External links
Official Games Workshop website

Board games introduced in 1999
Warhammer 40,000 tabletop games